Sir Arthur Harris (died 9 January 1632) was an English politician who sat in the House of Commons at various times between 1624 and 1629.

Harris was the son of Sir William Harris, of Cricksey, Essex. He was admitted at Sidney Sussex College, Cambridge in February 1601. He was admitted at Gray's Inn on 20 November 1605 and possibly at Lincoln's Inn on 28 April 1607.  He was of Cricksey and Woodham Mortimer, Essex, and was knighted on 15 July 1606. 

In 1624, he was elected Member of Parliament for Maldon in the Happy Parliament. He was appointed High Sheriff of Essex for 1625–26. He was elected MP for both Maldon and Essex in 1625 and chose to sit for Essex. In 1628 he was elected MP for Maldon again and sat until 1629 when King Charles decided to rule without parliament for eleven years.

Harris died in 1632. He had married firstly Anne Cranmer, daughter of Robert Cranmer, of Kent and secondly Anne Salter, daughter of Sir Nicolas Salter, of Enfield, Middlesex. He had sons Cranmer, John, Thomas and Salter.

References

 

Year of birth missing
1632 deaths
People from Maldon District
Alumni of Sidney Sussex College, Cambridge
Members of Gray's Inn
English MPs 1624–1625
English MPs 1625
English MPs 1628–1629
High Sheriffs of Essex
Members of Parliament for Maldon